Ali Yassin Mohamed (born 24 December 1965) is a Somali-Swedish Islamist militant. As of May 2009, Ali Yassin Mohamed was residing in Rinkeby in northern Stockholm.

Early life
Mohamed was born on 24 December 1965.

Alleged activities
In February 2008, Ali Yassin Mohamed, along with Omar Ali and Abdulkadir Okashe Ali, was arrested in Sweden suspected of financing the Somali Islamist insurgency group Al-Shabaab. Abdulkadir Okashe Ali was released after three days while Ali Yassin Mohamed and Omar Ali were detained in custody pending trial. On 11 June 2008, they were released from custody and on 12 September the same year the preliminary investigation was closed.

In January 2009, Ali Yassin Mohamed travelled to Somalia, where he participated in the founding of the Hizbul Islam organization.

The Treasury of the United kingdom put him among the targets for asset freeze on 28 April 2010.

See also 
 Fuad Mohamed Qalaf

References 

1965 births
Living people
Somalian emigrants to Sweden
Swedish people of Somali descent
Islamic terrorism in Sweden
Swedish Islamists
Hizbul Islam politicians